La Vie en lilali is the debut studio album by the Belgian Eurodance singer Kim Kay, released on 20 November 1998. The album was produced by Phil Sterman and Lov Cook. It features the artist's singles: "Oui oh oui", "Poupée de cire, poupée de son", "Bam bam", "Iniminimanimo", and perhaps the artist's most well-known hit, "Lilali".

Track listing

References

External links
 
 

1998 debut albums
Kim Kay albums
EMI Records albums
French-language albums